Ministry of Tourism, also known as the Ministry of Tourism and Air Transport, is a government ministry of Senegal. Its head office is on the 8th floor of the Immeuble Y2 Cité Keur Goorgui in Dakar.

, the minister is Mame Mbaye NIANG.

Agencies
 Bureau d'Enquête et d'Analyse pour la sécurité de l'aviation civile (Senegal)

References

External links
 

Aviation ministries
Government of Senegal
Senegal